The 1828 Massachusetts gubernatorial election was held on April 7.

Governor Levi Lincoln Jr., an Adams supporter, was re-elected to a fourth term in office over Democrat Marcus Morton, of the Jacksonian faction.

General election

Candidates
Levi Lincoln Jr., incumbent Governor since 1825 (Anti-Jacksonian)
Marcus Morton, Associate Justice of the Supreme Judicial Court and former acting Governor (Jacksonian)

Results
Morton carried only eighteen towns, all of them rural with the exception of Charlestown. The others were Adams, Cheshire, New Ashford, Alford, Tyringham, Montgomery, Westfield, Southwick, Holland, Dana, Charlton, Oxford, Sutton, Seekonk, Berkley, Freetown, and Woburn.

See also
 1827–1828 Massachusetts legislature

References

Governor
1828
Massachusetts
November 1828 events